Rocío del Alba García Martínez (born 29 August 1997) is a Spanish professional road cyclist and mountain biker.

See also
 List of 2016 UCI Women's Teams and riders

References

External links
 

1997 births
Living people
Spanish female cyclists
Cyclists from the Community of Madrid
Cyclists at the 2020 Summer Olympics
Olympic cyclists of Spain